Artificial Joy Club, at first known as Sal's Birdland, was a Canadian alternative rock band active in the 1990s. The group recorded three albums and had one hit single.

History
The band formed in 1993 when Louise Reny and Leslie Howe, formerly of the pop group One to One, joined with guitarist Michael Goyette, bassist Tim Dupont and drummer Andrew Lamarche. Initially taking the name Sal's Birdland ('Sal' was Reny's stage name), the group released its debut album, So Very Happy, in 1994.

In 1995, the group signed an international deal with Discovery Records', which re-worked So Very Happy with production assistance from Michael James and released the album Nude Photos Inside.

The label rejected their planned follow-up, and the band signed to Interscope Records, changing their name to Artificial Joy Club at the same time. Goyette, Dupont and Lamarche had previously used the name Artificial Joy Club for a short-lived side project with Ottawa singer Doug Wilson.

In 1997, they released two albums: Melt, and Sick And Beautiful. The song "Sick and Beautiful" was a No. 17 Billboard Modern Rock Tracks hit; it also climbed to No. 11 on the Radio and Records Alternative chart. It was also featured on the soundtrack for the 1998 film Homegrown.

The band then went on a full North American festival tour. It included opening the mainstage at Buzzfest '97, and appearing on the second stage bill at Lollapalooza.

In 1998, Artificial Joy Club released the three-track EP Spaceman, which was three versions of their song of the same name. They also released a video. The band broke up in 1999.

Discography

as Sal's Birdland
 So Very Happy (1994), Ghetto Records 
 Nude Photos Inside (1995), Ghetto Records, Discovery Records

as Artificial Joy Club
 Melt (1997), Interscope
 Sick And Beautiful (1997), Interscope, Crunchy Records
 Spaceman (EP) (1998), Interscope

References

External links
 Artificial Joy Club

Canadian alternative rock groups
Musical groups from Ottawa
Musical groups established in 1993
1993 establishments in Ontario
Musical groups disestablished in 1999
1999 disestablishments in Ontario